Bolesław Pylak (20 August 1921 – 6 June 2019) was a Polish prelate of the Roman Catholic Church. He was one of the oldest Roman Catholic bishops in Poland. Pylak was born in Łopiennik Górny, Poland and was ordained a priest on 29 June 1948 from Archdiocese of Lublin. Pylak was appointed Auxiliary bishop of the Lublin diocese as well as Titular bishop of Midica on 14 March 1966, and ordained a bishop on 29 May 1966. Pylak was appointed bishop of the Diocese of Lublin on 27 June 1975 and served in that capacity (becoming Archbishop 
in 1992 when Lublin became an Archdiocese) until his retirement on 14 June 1997.

See also
Archdiocese of Lublin

References

External links
Catholic-Hierarchy
Lublin Archdiocese (Polish)

20th-century Roman Catholic archbishops in Poland
1921 births
2019 deaths